Hospital furunculosis is a cutaneous condition that can be epidemic in the hospital setting, characterized histopathologically by a deep abscess with both lymphocytes and neutrophils.

See also 
 Furunculosis
 Skin lesion

References 

Bacterium-related cutaneous conditions